The 2004 Victorian Football League season was the 123rd season of the Australian rules football competition.

The premiership was won by the Sandringham Football Club, after defeating Port Melbourne by four points in the Grand Final on 19 September.

Premiership season

Ladder

Finals Series

Grand Final

Awards
The Jim 'Frosty' Miller Medal was won for the sixth consecutive year by Nick Sautner (Sandringham), who kicked 60 goals.
The J. J. Liston Trophy was won by Julian Field (North Ballarat), who polled 16 votes. Field finished ahead of Adam Fisher (Sandringham), who was second with 13 votes, and Jeremy Clayton (Port Melbourne), Daniel Harford (Northern Bullants) and Trent Bartlett (Tasmania), who were equal-third with 11 votes.
The Fothergill-Round Medal was won by Adam Fisher (Sandringham).
Port Melbourne won the reserves premiership. Port Melbourne 19.13 (127) defeated Williamstown 8.15 (63) in the Grand Final, held as a curtain-raiser to the Seniors Grand Final on 19 September.

Notable events
Early in the preseason,  announced its intention to terminate its affiliation with the Northern Bullants after one season, intending to resume fielding its own reserves team in the VFL. However, after a couple of months of uncertainty, the clubs revived their affiliation, with Carlton assuming greater control over the Bullants' operation and installing a Carlton assistant coach, Barry Mitchell, as Bullants senior coach.

See also 
 List of VFA/VFL premiers
 Australian Rules Football
 Victorian Football League
 Australian Football League
 2004 AFL season

References

Victorian Football League seasons
VFL